Sport Vereniging Robinhood is a Surinamese football club based in Paramaribo that competes in the Surinamese Hoofdklasse, the highest level of football in Suriname. Founded on 6 February 1945, Robinhood has built a reputation of being one of the strongest Surinamse football clubs in history and has won the most league and domestic titles in Surinamese football

Statistically, Robinhood is the most successful club in Surinamese football, having won a record 23 league titles, and a record of five Beker van Surinames and President's Cups apiece. The club was the first Surinamese club to make the final of a North American tournament, reaching the 1972 CONCACAF Champions' Cup final. Though making five North American club championship finals in their history, Robinhood has never won a continental title.

A majority of the club's success was during the 1970s and 1980s at the helm of longtime manager, Ronald Kolf, who led the club to the 15 of the 31 honors received. Following Kolf's departure in 2003, many cite a regression in Robinhood's form, as the club has failed to win any major trophy since 2005, when the club earned the double with the Hoofdklasse and Beker van Suriname titles.

Below is a list of seasons played by Robinhood and their performance in all domestic cup, league and continental competitions.

Key 

Key to regular season record
 Pld. = Played
 W = Won
 D = Tied
 L = Lost
 GF = Goals for
 GA = Goals against
 Pts = Points
 Pos = Final league position

Key to competitions
 Hoofdklasse = Suriname first division
 Eerste Klasse = Suriname second division
 CONCACAF = The CONCACAF Champions' Cup or CONCACAF Champions League
 CFU = The CFU Club Championship

Key to domestic cup rounds
 R1 = First Round
 R2 = Second Round
 R3 = Third Round
 QF = Quarterfinals
 SF = Semifinals

Key to CFU/CONCACAF
 QR1 = First Qualifying Round
 QR2 = Second Qualifying Round
 QR3 = Third Qualifying Round
 R4 = Fourth Round
 R3 = Third Round
 QF = Quarterfinals
 SF = Semifinals

Seasons

References
General
Hoofdklasse statistics sourced to: 
Beker van Suriname and President's Cup statistics sourced to: 

Individual Citations

Footnotes

Seasons
Robin